Jean Germain (11 September 1947 – 7 April 2015) was a French socialist politician.

Biography

Germain was the president of University of Tours from 1988 to 1993.
In 1995 he was elected mayor of Tours and president of the agglomeration community of Tours, Tour(s) Plus. 

In September 2011 Germain was elected as a Senator from the department of Indre-et-Loire.

Germain was a member of the French Socialist Party.

On 7 April 2015 he was found dead in his garage near his home in Tours, on the day that he was due to go on trial, accused of having illegally profited from Chinese bridal tours between 2007 and 2011. He left two suicide notes, protesting his innocence.

Footnotes

1947 births
2015 suicides
Mayors of places in Centre-Val de Loire
Presidents of the Regional Council of Centre-Val de Loire
Members of the Regional Council of Centre-Val de Loire
Socialist Party (France) politicians
Academic staff of the University of Tours
University of Tours alumni
Politicians from Tours, France
Suicides by firearm in France
French politicians who committed suicide
French Senators of the Fifth Republic
Senators of Indre-et-Loire